Raripara Union is a Union parishad of Kachua Upazila, Bagerhat District in Khulna Division of Bangladesh. It has an area of 55.32 km2 (21.36 sq mi) and a population of 19,101.

References

Unions of Kachua Upazila
Unions of Bagerhat District
Unions of Khulna Division